Soledad Roa-Duterte (born Soledad Gonzales Roa; November 14, 1916 – February 4, 2012) was a Filipina teacher and activist. She was the mother of Philippine president Rodrigo Duterte.

Early life
Duterte was born as Soledad Gonzales Roa on November 14, 1916, in Cabadbaran, Agusan (present-day Agusan del Norte) to Eleno Roa, a member of the Maranao tribe, and Fortunata Gonzales. Aside from being of Maranao descent, she is also of Kamayo descent. The Roas trace their roots to Leyte. Duterte accomplished her elementary and high school studies in Cabadbaran and entered the Philippine Normal School in Manila for her collegiate studies. She then entered the Bureau of Public Schools as a teacher.

Career
Duterte or Nanay Soling as called by her supporters, led the Yellow Friday Movement, a movement against the administration of then-President Ferdinand Marcos in Mindanao leading to the People Power Revolution. She also founded and oversaw the Soledad Duterte Foundation which conducted livelihood and skills training to the indigenous people of Marahan, near the boundary area of Bukidnon province. Duterte was also once a teacher at the University of the Visayas in the Danao Campus. She was also president and chairperson of the Welfare Action Foundation.

Death
She died at the Davao Doctors Hospital on February 4, 2012, at the age of 95.

Personal life
Duterte was married to Vicente Duterte, a lawyer from Cebu whom she first met during her stay at the Bureau of Public Schools. They settled in the Davao region in 1950. Vicente Duterte also served as governor of the now defunct Davao province. Vicente died in February 1968. She is the mother of Rodrigo Duterte, the 16th President of the Philippines, and the paternal grandmother of Paolo (Representative), Sara (Vice President) and Baste Duterte (Mayor of Davao). Duterte's other children are Eleanor Duterte; Benjamin "Bong" Duterte, a one-term city councilor of Davao between 1992 and 1995; Jocellyn Duterte, who lost in several attempts to grab a Third District city council seat as well as for the mayor post in 2001; and Emmanuel "Don/Blue Boy" Duterte who ran and lost in the First District congressional race in 1998.

References

1916 births
2012 deaths
20th-century Filipino educators
21st-century Filipino educators
Soledad Duterte
Filipino activists
Filipino schoolteachers
People from Agusan del Norte
People from Davao City
People from Southern Leyte
Philippine Normal University alumni